Lewis Litster (2 February 1904 – 11 March 1982) was an Australian cricketer. He played in ten first-class matches for Queensland between 1927 and 1933.

See also
 List of Queensland first-class cricketers

References

External links
 

1904 births
1982 deaths
Australian cricketers
Queensland cricketers
Sportspeople from Townsville
Cricketers from Queensland